The Battlefords Army Cadets (2537 Battleford Legion RCAC) is a free youth program open to youth aged 12 – 18 sponsored by the Canadian Forces and the civilian Army Cadet League of Canada.  2537 Battlefords Army Cadets are affiliated with the North Saskatchewan Regiment and cadets may wear the badges and accoutrements of the affiliated unit.

Basics
Along with the Royal Canadian Sea Cadets and Royal Canadian Air Cadets, the Royal Canadian Army Cadets is part of the Canadian Cadet Organization. Although the RCAC and the other cadet programs are funded by the Canadian Forces and the civilian Leagues, cadets are not members of the Forces, and are not expected to join the Canadian Forces.  In keeping with Commonwealth custom, the Royal Canadian Army Cadets stand second in the order of precedence, after the Royal Canadian Sea Cadets, and before the Royal Canadian Air Cadets.

People aged 12 to 18 may join the RCAC, free of charge. Uniforms, training manuals, and instruction are provided. A cadet must leave the organization before their 19th birthday. Upon departing most items issued to them during their time in the program must be returned.

The organization and rank system of the Canadian Army is used, but cadets now use only Non-Commissioned Officer ranks, whereas at one time Commissioned Officer Cadet ranks (from Lieutenant up to and including Colonel) were used.  Army Cadet Corps are usually affiliated to a Reserve or Regular Force army regiment and wear the accoutrements of their affiliated unit. Adult leadership is provided by members of the Canadian Forces Reserve Subcomponent Cadet Organization Administration and Training Service composed mostly of officers of the Cadet Instructor Cadre (CIC) Branch, supplemented, if necessary, by contracted Civilian Instructors, authorized adult volunteers, and, on occasion, officers and non-commissioned members of other CF branches. The CIC Branch is specifically trained to deliver the Royal Canadian Sea, Army, and Air Cadet training program, and like all reservists come from all walks of life and all parts of the community. Some are former cadets, many have former regular or reserve force service.

RCAC Badge 
The Royal Canadian Army Cadet Badge is the official emblem of RCAC. It is worn on the upper sleeve of the cadet uniform and on the breast of the issue parkas. It is also worn as a brass cap badge in place of an affiliated unit badge or for non-affiliated corps.  The term Acer Acerpori is Latin for "as the maple, so the sapling."

As a Cadet Corps affiliated with the North Saskatchewan Regiment, senior Cadets are authorized to wear the North Saskatchewan Regiment Cap Brass on their Beret.

Aim
The aim of Royal Canadian Army Cadets is to develop in youth the attributes of good citizenship and leadership; promote physical fitness; and stimulate the interest of youth in the sea, land and air activities of the Canadian Forces. The RCAC shares this aim with the Sea and Air Cadets; however, each organization focuses on its own parent element.

History

Commanding Officers

Corps Name Changes

Corps Parade History

Financial Support and Funding

Program Funding 

Administered by the Canadian Forces, the program is funded through the Department of National Defence with the civilian partner providing support in the local community.  The funding by the DND for Cadet activities extends to the issue of Uniforms and Equipment for authorized training.

Public support 
As an Army Cadet corps the 2537 Battlefords Army Cadets are expected to participate in fundraising for activities for any additional requirements that are not provided by Program Funding.  Specifically the 2537 Battlefords Army Cadets maintain and pay for their training facilities through their fundraising efforts with the sponsoring committee for the corps.  The training facilities are not fully funded by the Program Funding and therefore fundraising is required to sustain operations for the Local Cadet Programme.

Sponsoring Committee 
The sponsoring committee is responsible to the Commanding Officer to ensure that all fundraising needs are met for the year.  They form a committee of people that will manage the finances for the Battleford Army Cadets and are responsible to ensure that funding is secured for anything that would not be otherwise covered by Cadet Program funding.  The sponsoring committee is made up of volunteers that include parents, and people from the community.

Army Cadet Training

Star Level Program 

The Star Level Program is the main training program carried out by all Royal Canadian Army Cadet Corps in Canada.  This program is mandated by the Department of National Defence, through the Directorate of Cadets & Junior Rangers.

The Star Level Program is composed of four levels:

Green Star (Level 1)
Red Star (Level 2)
Silver Star (Level 3)
Gold Star (Level 4)
Master Cadet (Level 5 and above)

Starting in the 2012-13 training year, the National Star of Excellence or NSE replaced the National Star Certification Examination or NSCE as a ranking tool for Senior Cadets. Year 5 of LHQ training was also introduced as "Master Cadet" consisting of a great deal of On-the-job Training (OJT) and self-led professional development opportunities.

Cadets are taught a variety of subjects, known as Performance Objectives (PO) that include: citizenship, physical fitness, healthy living, drill, marksmanship, map and compass, outdoor survival, eco-friendly camping and military history and traditions.  To better assist in understanding the Star Level training, the Star programs are identified as follows:

Green Star 
PO 101—Participate in Citizenship Activities:  Cadets are introduced to Canadian history, traditions and symbols.  Cadets are also introduced to Canada's political system, along with a high-education of the Canadian Forces.
PO 102 – Perform Community Service:  Cadets are introduced to the concept of volunteerism and importance of community involvement.
PO 103 – Participate as a Member of a Team:  Cadets are introduced to the concept of teamwork and are introduced to the roles of a follower.
PO 104 – Develop a Personal Activity Plan:  Cadets are introduced to the importance of physical activity, physical fitness and physical health.
PO 105 – Participate in Recreational Sports:  Cadets participate in a variety of recreational sports, such as running, biking, hiking, marches and swimming activities.
PO 106 – Fire the Cadet Air Rifle Marksmanship
PO 107 – Serve in an Army Cadet Corps:  Cadets are introduced to the history and traditions of the Cadet Corps.  Cadets are introduced to Green Star and Year 1 training opportunities.  Cadets are taught the basic rules with regards to being a cadet.
PO 108 – Participate in an Annual Ceremonial Review (ACR) Parade:  Cadets are introduced and taught ceremonial drill, in preparation for public parades.
PO 109 – Participate in Fieldcraft
PO 120 – Demonstrate Knowledge of the Organization and Traditions of the Canadian Forces:
PO 121 – Participate as a Member of a Group During a Weekend Bivouac Exercise:
PO 122 – Identify Location Using a Map:
PO 123 – Participating in a Day Hike:

Red Star 
PO 201 – Identify the Role of an Environmentally Conscious Canadian Citizen:
PO 202 – Perform Community Services:
PO 203 – Demonstrate Leadership Attributes Within a Peer Setting:
PO 204 – Update Personal Activity Plan:
PO 205 – Participate in Recreational Sports:
PO 206 – Fire the Cadet Air Cadet Rifle During Recreational marksmanship:
PO 207 – Serve in an Army Cadet Corps:
PO 208 – Execute Drill as a Member of a Squad:
PO 211 – Participate in Competitive Summer Biathlon Activities:
PO 220 – Recognize Canadian Forces Peace Support Operations:
PO 221 – Perform the Duties of a Section Member During a Weekend Bivouac Exercise:
PO 222 – Navigate Along a Route Using a Map and Compass:
PO 223 – Hike along a Route as Part of an Overnight Exercise:
PO 224 – Identify Immediate Actions to Take when Lost:

Silver Star 
PO 301 – Recognize the Purpose of Service Groups within Canada:
PO 302 – Perform Community Service:
PO 303 – Perform the Role of a Team Leader:
PO 304 – Update Personal Activity Plan:
PO 305 – Participate in Recreational Sports:
PO 306 – Fire the Cadet Air Rifle During Recreational Marksmanship:
PO 307 – Serve in an Army Cadet Corps:
PO 308 – Direct a Squad Prior to A Parade:
PO 309 – Instruct a Lesson:
PO 311 – Participate in a Recreational Summer Biathlon Activity:
PO 320 – Recognize the Valour of Members of the Canadian Army:
PO 321 – Perform the Duties of a Team Leader On A Weekend Bivouac Exercise:
PO 322 – Plot Location on a Topographical Map Using A Global Positioning System Receiver:
PO 324 – Survive When Lost:
PO 325 – Identify the Competencies of an Outdoor Leader:
PO 326 – Perform Expedition Skills:

Gold Star 
PO 401 - Recognize How the Legal System Affects Youth:
PO 402 - Perform Community Service:
PO 403 - Act as a Team Leader:
PO 404 - Update personal Activity Plan:
PO 405 - Participate in Recreational Sports:
PO 406 - Fire the Cadet Air Rifle During Recreational Marksmanship:
PO 407 - Serve in an Army Cadet Corps:
PO 408 - Command a Platoon on Parade:
PO 409 - Instruct a Lesson:
PO 420 - Identify the Structure of the Canadian Army:
PO 422 - Follow a Multi-Leg Route Using a Global Positioning System (GPS) Receiver:
PO 424 - Employ Natural Resources in a Survival:
PO 425 - Develop an Expedition Plan:
 Section 1 - Establish Expedition parameters:
 Section 2 - Plan an Expedition Route:
 Section 3 - Develop an Expedition Equipment List:
 Section 4 - Develop an Expedition Ration Plan:
 Section 5 - Discuss Actions Taken when a Person is Lost:
 Section 6 - Analyze Problems Using an Expedition Case Study:
PO 426 - Perform Expedition Skills:

Summer training 
Selected Army Cadets attend summer training at locations across Canada. The training supports and expands the Local Headquarters program. Courses last from two to six weeks, with most cadets attending the two-week "General Training" (Commonly referred to as "GT", as Basic is now a new section of three-week courses) Course in their first year. Experienced cadets may apply to be employed as staff cadets to assist the adult instructors.

Summer Training Courses 
Summer Training Courses are as follows:
General Training (2 Weeks)
Basic Expedition (3 weeks)
Basic Drill & Ceremonial (3 weeks)
Basic Fitness & Sports (3 Weeks)
Basic Marksman (3 Weeks)
Basic Military Band (3 Weeks)
Basic Pipes and Drums (P&D) (3 Weeks)
Fullbore Marksman Phase I (6 Weeks) (Connaught CSTC Only)
Intermediate Military Band (6 Weeks)
Intermediate Pipes and Drums (P&D) (6 Weeks)
Expedition Instructor (EI) (6 Weeks)
Drill and Ceremonial Instructor (DCI) (6 Weeks)
Fullbore Marksman Phase II (7 Weeks) (Connaught
CSTC Only)
Fitness and Sports Instructor (FSI) (6 Weeks)
Air Rifle Marksmanship Instructor (ARMI) (6 Weeks)
Once a cadet has completed an Instructor-level course he or she may apply for advanced the training to be appointed as a staff cadet at a summer training centre (CSTC) or engage in the advanced training course or exchange, such as:
Advanced Military Band (6 Weeks)
Advanced Pipes and Drums (P&D) (6 Weeks)
Leadership & Challenge
Outward Bound: Wales/Scotland
Canadian Forces Basic Parachutist Course
Maple Leaf Exchange
National Rifle Team (Bisley)
Other various exchanges under the ACE (Army Cadet Exchange) Program

Summer Training Centres 
There are 8 Army Cadet Summer Training Centres across Canada and they are:
Blackdown Cadet Training Centre
ACSTC Argonaut|Argonaut Army Cadet Summer Training Centre
Connaught National Army Cadet Summer Training Centre (Connaught NACTSC)
Mont St-Sacrement Cadet Summer Training Centre
Rocky Mountain National Army Cadet Summer Training Centre (RMNACSTC)
Valcartier Army Cadet Summer Training Centre
Vernon Army Cadet Summer Training Centre (VACSTC)
Whitehorse Cadet Summer Training Centre (WCSTC)

Rank structure
There is a basic similarity between the Army Cadet ranks and the Canadian Forces Army ranks.
Cadet,
Lance Corporal,
Corporal,
Master Corporal,
Sergeant,
Warrant Officer,
Master Warrant Officer,
Chief Warrant Officer.

Note: The second rank of Lance Corporal, formerly "Private", was changed in January 2010, due to the French translation "Soldat" being the word "soldier".
If a Cadets Corps has an affiliation with a Unit of the CF that traditionally has a different word for the Rank of "Private", they are then entitled to make use of that alternative title.
Thus, Corps affiliated with the Royal Canadian Artillery would use "Gunner" (Also the term Bombardier & Master Bombardier could substitute for Corporal & Master Corporal)
 - Rifle Regiments - Rifleman
 - Highland (Scottish) Regiments - Highlander
 - Combat Engineer Regiments - Sapper
 - Armoured (Cavalry) Regiments - Trooper
 - Signals (Communications)Regiments - Signalman
 - Artillery Regiments - Gunner
N.B.:  The above list may not be comprehensive, nor does it address French nomenclatures.

External links 
Official site
Army Cadet League of Canada
 Royal Canadian Army Cadets History – Army Cadet League of Canada

Military of Canada
Army cadet organisations
Canadian Cadet organizations
Youth organizations based in Canada
North Battleford